The 2006 New Zealand Music Awards took place on 18 October 2006 at the Aotea Centre in Auckland. The best Jazz album was presented at the New Zealand Jazz Festival in November.

Bic Runga, the Bleeders and Fat Freddy's Drop each won two awards each. Dave Dobbyn won his 15th award as a musical artist.

Awards and nominees
The Maori Album awards were merged into one category.

Winners are listed first and highlighted in boldface.
Key
 – Non-technical award
 – Technical award

Performers
Live Performances on the night 
 Frontline & Aaradhna performed "Lost in Translation"
 The Bleeders performed "Out of Time"
 Elemeno P & Friends (Carly Binding, Boh Runga and Brad Carter) performed "S.O.S" (Lani Purkis was absent from the awards and this performance as she had just given birth)
 Bic Runga performed "Say After Me" 
 Concord Dawn performed "Broken Eyes"
 Don McGashen & Hollie Smith performed "Bathe in the River"

References

External links
 On the Red Carpet, NZ Herald
 NZMA 2006-8 performances, YouTube

New Zealand Music Awards
Music Awards
Aotearoa Music Awards
October 2006 events in New Zealand